Richard Bowker CBE (born 1966) is the former chairman of UK Athletics and independent director of the English Football League. He is a former chief executive of National Express and Etihad Railway and former chairman and chief executive of the Strategic Rail Authority. He attended Queen Elizabeth's Grammar School, Blackburn, read economics at Leicester University, and played as a professional session pianist for a year. Bowker is a chartered management accountant and was a non-executive director of British Waterways and of the London Marathon. In the 2004 New Year's Honours List, he was appointed a CBE.

In 1989 he joined the London Underground as a graduate finance trainee; in the course of this work, he was credited with the launch of a new leasing system for trains in 1997. Bowker was appointed co-chairman of Virgin Rail Group in 1999 and commercial director of the Virgin Group in 2000. He also founded the transport consultancy Quasar Associated.

In 2001 he was appointed chairman and chief executive of the Strategic Rail Authority. In 2006, he was appointed chief executive of National Express Group. From 2009 to 2012 he acted as chief executive of Etihad Railway in the United Arab Emirates.

In 2012 he was appointed as the second ever independent non-executive director of the English Football League. In 2017 he replaced Ed Warner as chairman of UK Athletics. Less than two years later he resigned ahead of a vote of no confidence.

References 

British businesspeople
1966 births
Living people
People educated at Queen Elizabeth's Grammar School, Blackburn
British people in rail transport
Commanders of the Order of the British Empire